Private Transport is the first album by The Guild League released in 2002 on Candle Records (catalogue number TGL02). Travel and a celebration of the everyday are recurring themes.

Track listing
 "Jet Set...Go!"  
 "The Neatest Hand  "
 "Cosmetropolis (London Swings)"  
 "Balham Rise"
 "The Photographer"  
 "Baggage Handling"  
 "Dangerous Safety"  
 "What Adults Do"  
 "Siamese Couplets"  
 "Gravity"  
 "A Maze In Greys"  
 "Cornflakes"  
 "A Faraway Place"

2002 albums